The Two Graphs is a 1950 detective novel by John Rhode, the pen name of the British writer Cecil Street. It is the fiftieth in his long-running series of novels featuring Lancelot Priestley, a Golden Age armchair detective. It was published in America by Dodd Mead under the alternative title Double Identities. Writing in The Observer Maurice Richardson noted a "slight slackening of tension towards the finish but an excellent specimen of Rhode’s later period."

Synopsis
In the Norfolk Broads one of a pair of identical twin brothers drowns, but it is not clear which one. Matters are further complicated when the surviving twin is poisoned.

References

Bibliography
 Evans, Curtis. Masters of the "Humdrum" Mystery: Cecil John Charles Street, Freeman Wills Crofts, Alfred Walter Stewart and the British Detective Novel, 1920-1961. McFarland, 2014.
 Herbert, Rosemary. Whodunit?: A Who's Who in Crime & Mystery Writing. Oxford University Press, 2003.
 Magill, Frank Northen . Critical Survey of Mystery and Detective Fiction: Authors, Volume 4. Salem Press, 1988.
 Reilly, John M. Twentieth Century Crime & Mystery Writers. Springer, 2015.

1950 British novels
Novels by Cecil Street
British crime novels
British mystery novels
British thriller novels
British detective novels
Geoffrey Bles books
Novels set in Norfolk
Twins in fiction